"No Me Compares" is a song recorded by the Spanish singer-songwriter Alejandro Sanz. It was released as the first single from his ninth studio album La Música No Se Toca (2012) and based on the opening theme song in the telenovela Amores verdaderos. The song was released for digital download on June 25, 2012 . In the day of release, he put a Lyric video on his VEVO channel on YouTube and at the end of the video, he announced the name of his new album, La Música No Se Toca. The single was nominated for Song of the Year and Record of the Year at the 13th Annual Latin Grammy Awards.

Song information 

The song is a romantic song about Sanz telling his love how he feels about her. At the start of the chorus he sings " Vengo del aire, Que te secaba a ti la piel, mi amor ". It means " I come from the air that dried your skin, my love." Also at the end of the second chorus he finished the main part of the song by singing " Yo soy tu alma, Tú eres mi aire." It means " I'm your soul, You're my air."

Music video

Alejandro Sanz released the music video on his VEVO Channel on June 29, 2012, four days after releasing the audio. The music video was filmed in Miami.  It's about Sanz's memories from his past, which are washing up along the shore.  The video starts small with little objects then it gets bigger and bigger . During this time he is getting flashbacks of his childhood which is interpreted by Fabio Leal and a lost love.  At the ending she comes back and they walk away with each other.  The director of the video was Ethan Lader who has also directed videos for Bruno Mars, Mariah Carey, and Jason Derulo.

Live performances
On Alejandro's official website, he announced that he will be a part of "Cap Roig Festival 2012" and will perform a concert. Then on his page on the festival's website, they announced that Alejandro will perform "No Me Compares" live for the first time on August 18 in the festival. After that he performed this music on so many stages including his recently worldwide tour and at the 13th Annual Latin Grammy Awards.

Duet version
A Brazilian-Portuguese version, named "Não Me Compares", was released as single only in Brazil on December 1, 2012, featured Brazilian recording artist Ivete Sangalo. The music video was released on December 18. The song was included in Brazilian version of La Música No Se Toca and in the soundtrack of soap opera Salve Jorge.

Track listing
Download digital
"No Me Compares" – 4:38

Brazilian version
"Não Me Compares" (featuring Ivete Sangalo) – 5:07

Chart performance

Weekly charts

Song Credits
 Productores: Julio Reyes Copello, Alejandro Sanz
 Ingenieros de Grabacion: Edgar Barrera, Alejandro Sanz, Julio Reyes Copello
 Mezclada por: Sebastian Krys
 Arreglos y Programacion: Julio Reyes Copello
 Guitarras Acusticas: Andres Castro
 Coros: Robert Elias, Jackie Mendez
 Teclados: Julio Reyes Copello
 Piano: Julio Reyes Copello

See also
List of number-one songs of 2012 (Mexico)
List of Billboard number-one Latin songs of 2012

References

External links
"No Me Compares" Lyrics
"No Me Compares" Official Lyric video
"No Me Compares" Video behind the scene

2012 singles
Alejandro Sanz songs
Monitor Latino Top General number-one singles
Number-one singles in Spain
Songs written by Alejandro Sanz
Spanish-language songs
Pop ballads
Universal Music Latino singles
2012 songs
Song recordings produced by Julio Reyes Copello